The 1978 Primera División season was the 87th season of top-flight football in Argentina. Quilmes won the Metropolitano (2nd title) and Independiente achieved the Nacional championship (12th title).

Banfield and Estudiantes (BA) were relegated.

Metropolitano Championship

Nacional Championship

Group A

Group B

Group C

Group D

Quarterfinals

Semifinals

Final

First leg

Second leg

References

Argentine Primera División seasons
p
p
Argentine Primera Division
1978 in Argentine football